Ian Prior (born 21 August 1990) is an Australian professional rugby union player who currently plays for the Western Force in Super Rugby AU and Super Rugby Trans-Tasman. He previously played for the Force, Reds and Brumbies teams in Australia at Super Rugby level, as well as for English club Harlequins. Prior's usual position is scrum-half but he can also play fly-half.

Rugby union career
Prior played for the  team at the 2010 Junior World Championship in Argentina.

Prior moved to Canberra prior to the start of the 2012, where he signed a two-year deal to play for the Brumbies.

He joined the Perth-based Western Force ahead of the 2014 Super Rugby season. After the removal of the Force from the Super Rugby competition in the latter half of 2017, Prior signed a short term deal to play for English club Harlequins, and then rejoined the Force as captain for the new World Series Rugby season in 2018.

Later that year, he was also targeted as a potential player for Zimbabwe, but took no part in their Africa Cup campaign. Prior remained captain of the Western Force for the 2018 National Rugby Championship.

Super Rugby statistics

References

External links
Brumbies profile

1990 births
Australian rugby union players
Australian people of Zimbabwean descent
ACT Brumbies players
Queensland Reds players
Western Force players
Rugby union scrum-halves
Sportspeople from Bundaberg
Living people
Perth Spirit players
Harlequin F.C. players
Rugby union players from Queensland